The  (Sudeten German Free Corps, also known as the ,  and ) was a paramilitary Nazi organization founded on 17 September 1938 in Germany on direct order of Adolf Hitler. The organization was composed mainly of ethnic German citizens of Czechoslovakia with pro-Nazi sympathies who were sheltered, trained and equipped by the German army and who were conducting cross border terrorist operations into Czechoslovak territory from 1938 to 1939. They played an important role in Hitler's successful effort to occupy Czechoslovakia and annex the region known as Sudetenland into the Third Reich under Nazi Germany.

This understanding has been assumed also by the contemporary Czech Constitutional Court. Meanwhile, Nazi Germany formally declared that Czech captives would be considered prisoners of war from 23 September onwards.

Background

From 1918 to 1938, after the breakup of the Austro-Hungarian Empire, more than three million ethnic Germans were living in the Czech part of the newly created state of Czechoslovakia.

In 1933, as Adolf Hitler assumed power in Germany, Sudeten German pro-Nazi leader Konrad Henlein founded Sudeten German Party (SdP) that served as the branch of the Nazi Party for the Sudetenland. By 1935, the SdP was the second largest political party in Czechoslovakia. On 24 April, the SdP issued a series of demands upon the government of Czechoslovakia, that were known as the Carlsbad Program. Among the demands, Henlein demanded autonomy for Germans living in Czechoslovakia. The Czechoslovakian government responded by saying that it was willing to provide more minority rights to the German minority but it refused to grant them autonomy.

By June 1938, the party had over 1.3 million members, i.e. 40.6% of the ethnic German citizens of Czechoslovakia (40% of them women). During the last free democratic elections before the German occupation of Czechoslovakia, the May 1938 communal elections, the party gained 88% of ethnic German votes, taking over control of most municipal authorities in the Czech borderland. The country's mass membership made it one of the largest fascist parties in Europe at the time.

The first major crisis took place in May 1938 after a partial Czechoslovak army mobilization. Activities of pro-Nazi ethnic Germans in the area led to a large flight of ethnic-Czech civilians and especially Jews. Hitler's increasing threats of attacking Czechoslovakia led to full mobilization on 22 September 1938.

,

Forming of the organization
"Brownshirts" or "Storm Troopers"), the original paramilitary wing of the German Nazi Party.

SdP's chief Konrad Henlein was the 's leader, with Fritz Köllner becoming its secretary and Willi Brandner the chief of staff, also responsible for the buildup of squad groups. By 17 May 1938, the date of the organization's official registration, the  had over 15.000 members.

The  started a wide recruitment program in June 1938. Its members were divided into three categories:
 Category A: The most trusted and physically capable members that were supposed to carry out the duty of guardians of "inner purity" of the SdP. Category A was composed of the so-called "surveillance departments" and was directly subordinate to the SdP. Apart from functions within the organization, its members were also collecting information on political opponents and conducting military espionage.
 Category B: Wider selection of members. Its members were trained for propaganda activities and for conducting terrorist and sabotage assaults.
 Category C: Mostly older members of FS, mainly former soldiers with World War I front line experience. Their main task was providing training to the B category members as well as being the FS's reserve force.

FS squads were being built up as militias with local, district and regional formations and central staff. FS further created special squads: communication, medical and rear. The FS's squad leaders were trained directly by the Nazi  in Germany.

The FS became instrumental for the psychological warfare of the operation Case Green, smuggling weapons through "green border" from Germany, conducting various provocations of Czechoslovak armed forces and provocations on the border with Germany.

Attempted putsch

The German Nazi Party was convening its 10th congress between 5 and 12 September 1938 in Nuremberg, where it was expected that Hitler would make clear his further plans as regards Czechoslovakia. FS squads were kept in a state of high alert, ready to conduct any orders that may come from "higher up". On 10 September 1938, all FS district headquarters received orders to start large scale demonstrations, which escalated to a number of members of Czechoslovak law enforcement being wounded, as well as FS members in numerous cities already the next day. FS Vice- Karl Hermann Frank was in direct contact with Hitler, receiving instructions for the following days.

Immediately after the highly anticipated Hitler's final speech on 12 September 1938, in which Hitler declared his intention to take care of German interests "under any circumstances" and to "prevent the creation of a second Palestine in the heart of Europe where the poor Arabs are defenseless and abandoned, while Germans in Czechoslovakia are not defenseless, nor abandoned", the FS initiated widespread violence in the whole borderland. In Cheb alone, K. H. Frank's hometown, ethnic-German mob plundered 38 Czech and Jewish shops. Other main targets included buildings of the German Social Democratic Party and Czechoslovak authorities, including schools. The FS conducted over 70 armed assaults against Czechoslovak authorities and assaulted selected Czechs and ethnic German anti-fascists. Czechoslovak law enforcement was meanwhile ordered not to intervene in order not to further fuel up Hitler's propaganda.

As it became clear that the SdP was attempting to push the Czechoslovak authorities out of the towns in the borderland and replace them with its own governance, and with the rising death toll that included, inter alia, the murder of four gendarmes by the FS in Habartov, the Czechoslovak government responded by declaring martial law in the thirteen worst struck districts and by dispatching the military. Major assaults on Czechoslovak law enforcement as well as the military continued throughout 14 September 1938, with the last one taking place on 15 September in Bublava. Altogether, the violence led to 13 dead and numerous injuries on 12–13 September and culminated with 23 dead (13 Czechoslovak authorities personnel, 10 ethnic Germans) and 75 seriously wounded (of those 14 ethnic Germans) on 14 September. However, the attempted putsch was thwarted.

On 14 September 1938, the SdP's leadership ran across the border to Selb, Germany, where K. H. Frank unsuccessfully demanded immediate military intervention from Hitler. The leadership's flight had chilling effect on the FS members, especially those that had taken part in the violence and now feared criminal prosecution. On 15 September 1938, German radio broadcast a speech by Henlein, who was purportedly speaking live from Aš in Czechoslovakia. By this time, the SdP's flight to Germany had become public knowledge and according to the then German ambassador in Prague, instead of stimulating SdP's members to further actions, it led to a serious rift in its ranks.

On 16 September 1938, Czechoslovak authorities banned and dissolved the SdP as well as the FS. Many of its functionaries as well as members that were wanted for arrest in connection with the preceding violence fled to Germany, while a number of town mayors elected for the SdP exhorted FS members to keep calm and expressed their support to the commanders of Gendarme stations situated in their towns.

Freikorps

Formation
Czechoslovakia conducted partial mobilization in May 1938. Many young ethnic Germans did not follow the mobilization order and deserted across the border to Germany instead. Thousands more fled as they were receiving mobilization orders after 12 September 1938. The  first initiated a plan of including Czechoslovak ethnic Germans of 20–35 years of age, who had previously undergone military training in the Czechoslovak army, into its own ranks. Konrad Henlein was formally named the ' commanding officer, with the 's liaison officer Lieutenant Colonel Friedrich Köchling, previously serving as liaison officer in the Hitler Youth, being the ' de facto commander. The  was further instructed to conceal its cooperation with the  due to "political reasons".

The ' ranks were filling up rather fast. It had 10,000–15,000 members by 20 September 1938, 26,000 members by 22 September 1938, with many more deserters coming after the general Czechoslovak mobilization that took place on 23 September 1938 and reaching 41,000 by 2 October 1938. Apart from Konrad Henlein, its leadership consisted of K. H. Frank (vice-commander in chief), Hans Blaschek (2nd vice-commander in chief), and Anton Pfrogner (chief of staff, previously an SdP senator). The ' headquarters was situated in a castle near Bayreuth, Germany. The  was divided into four groups alongside the whole German-Czechoslovak border. Groups were further divided into battalions and companies. Depending on the border length and local conditions, there were also sometimes "sections" as an interstage between the battalion and companies.

Companies had 150–200 men each and were stationed in German towns and villages along the German–Czech border, each of them being fully equipped for independent cross border raids and assaults. All members got regular pay for their service. Most members did not have any standardized uniform and were only distinguished by an armband with swastika.

They committed assassinations, robberies and bombing attacks, retreating over the border to Germany when faced with serious opposition. They murdered more than 110 and abducted to Germany more than 2000 Czechoslovak personnel, political opponents or their family members.

Intelligence service
The  also had its own intelligence service, established on 19 September 1938 with headquarters in Selb, Germany. It was headed by Richard Lammel.

Green Cadres
Many ethnic Germans who deserted after receiving the mobilization order did not go across the border to Germany, but rather established their own guerrilla units. Operating from forests in Czechoslovakia, they received the name Green Cadres, sometimes being referred to as Green , although they were not officially incorporated as part of the German .

Armaments
The most common weapons were Mannlicher M1895 8×56 Msch., K98k 8×56 JS, pistols P08 9mm Parabellum, Bergmann machine guns and sub-machine guns, and German hand grenades. Due to the initial Czechoslovak orders forbidding the use of firearms apart from self-defense, the  also captured Czechoslovak weapons, mostly vz. 24 rifles and vz. 26 machine guns.

Scoped hunting rifles in the hands of skilled  proved especially deadly.

Czechoslovak security forces

Following the remilitarization of the Rhineland, Czechoslovak authorities came to the conclusion that any future war would most probably begin as a sudden attack without a formal declaration of war. At the time, protection of borders was mostly vested into the authority of the Customs Administration (also called Financial Police), which was controlling the border crossings and collecting customs duties, while Gendarme officers were taking care of general law enforcement mainly within towns. This was deemed insufficient as the Customs Administration could merely enforce the custom duties and general order at border crossings, but not security along the whole border. In 1936, the State Defense Guard was established. Normally, SDG would function only in a very limited way necessary to ensure full readiness of its structure (under authority of the Ministry of Interior), with its ranks being filled up with personnel in case of emergency (under military command). Its main task was protecting the Czechoslovak border and it was supposed to be able to immediately close and defend the border for the time that would be necessary for the army to reach the attacked areas in full combat readiness. Initially, the State Defense Guard was composed of selected members of Customs Administration, Gendarme and State Police, but later its ranks were filled also with reliable civilians. In case of any unrest, its squads were further boosted by army soldiers. The State Defense Guard included also ethnic Germans that were deemed loyal to the Czechoslovak state (mostly Social Democrats and communists). The State Defense Guard thus became the main target of the ' activities.

Up to 22 September 1938 the Czechoslovak security forces were under general orders not to use their firearms apart from self-defense.

Republikanische Wehr
 was a Czechoslovak ethnic German anti-fascist militia with several thousand members. Several of its members were killed by the Nazi forces during the clashes, with thousands more being interned in concentration camps following the Munich Agreement and occupation of Czechoslovakia.

Undeclared German–Czechoslovak War

The first  assaults took place during the night of 17 to 18 September 1938 in the area of Aš. Other major  assaults included, inter alia:

18 September 1938

19 September 1938

20 September 1938

On 20 September 1938,  headquarters issued Order No. 6 signed by Henlein. According to the order, each of the groups was supposed to undertake at least 10 major raids into Czechoslovak before the morning of 21 September. Moreover, each group was ordered to establish its own intelligence staff that would be providing information to the center in Selb. In line with the order,  attacks increased both in their frequency as well as brutality.

21 September 1938

22 September 1938

On the night of 21 September 1938, German radio broadcast false information that Czechoslovakia agreed to cede its border areas to Germany. Next day, most ethnic German majority towns were full of German Nazi flags and Hitler portraits, while  and ethnic German mobs unleashed a wave of attacks against state authorities and non-German civilians.

Czechoslovak forces' order not to use firearms except in self-defense was called off during the day.

By 24 September 1938,  conducted over 300 raids against Czechoslovak authorities.

23 September 1938

Hitler gave new orders under which captured Czechs were to be considered and treated as prisoners of war. Captives that could prove Slovak or Hungarian nationality were to be regarded as refugees to Germany.

By 11 am, the Czechoslovak government officially declared that it was unable to exercise Czechoslovak authority in two border districts (Osoblaha and Jindřichov). State officials from these regions were ordered to retreat towards a new line of defense manned by the army.

In other areas the Czechoslovak army started offensive actions which led to recapturing of areas in and around Varnsdorf, from which SDG squads retreated in the previous days.

At 11:30 pm, Czechoslovakia declared full army mobilization as well as full stationing of Czechoslovak border fortifications.

24 September 1938

 leadership gave out an order that  fighting units must compel ethnic German mayors of Czechoslovak border towns to send telegraphs to the  asking for immediate German intervention. The order specifically mentioned that telegrams must reach Hitler before his planned meeting with Chamberlain, and at the same time they were to be sent in a manner that did not connect them back to  nor raise suspicion of concerted action.

Czechoslovak full army mobilization had a chilling effect on  membership and led to a lower number of attacks. As the Czechoslovak forces started retaking territory lost in previous days, retreating  looted public buildings and "confiscated" money and valuables from bank vaults.

The German Army was given sole authority over German border areas with Czechoslovakia. This led to quarrels between  lower officers and  officers over the actual line of command. The  was ordered to conduct raids over the border only after briefing the respective local leader of the German border guard.

25 September 1938

26 September 1938

Adolf Hitler ordered  to conduct more assaults. The number of assaults became higher than in previous days, but did no reach the intensity of 21–22 September.

27 September 1938

28 September 1938

29 September 1938

30 September 1938

Following the signing of the Munich Agreement,  leadership gave orders to cease cross-border assaults.

According to a final report of Friedrich Köchling, officially the 's liaison officer to  but its de facto leader up to 4 October 1938,  had killed 110 people, wounded 50 and kidnapped 2,029 to Germany.

From 7 October 1938,  were headquartered in a former Czechoslovak Bank building in Cheb. On 10 October 1938  was officially disbanded.

As  operations involved a large scale looting and "borrowing" in its area of operation, aggrieved parties were given up to 15 November 1938 to request damages from newly established German authorities in the occupied area. Court cases dealing with these claims were running as far as 1942.

Criminal liability

Germany
Being aware that  actions involved a large-scale criminal activity, Adolf Hitler issued a decree on 7 June 1939, according to which all of the actions that were criminal under Czech law would be considered lawful under German law, and those that were criminal under German law were pardoned.

Czechoslovakia
Meanwhile, their active participation in crossborder raids which included murders, attempted murders and kidnapping was punishable by death under the 1852 Criminal Code.

The vast majority of the perpetrators who survived the war avoided justice through the postwar expulsion of Germans from Czechoslovakia.

Individual cases were decided by a Special Tribunal set up in the city of Cheb. The Tribunal decided 62 cases, last on 29 October 1948. 10  members were sentenced to death (of which sentences 6 were carried out), 16 to life imprisonment, 5 to 30 years' imprisonment, 10 to 25 years' imprisonment and 16 to 20 years' imprisonment. The majority had however already been released and expelled to Germany in 1955, which was the year in which Czechoslovakia officially declared the end of the war with Germany that started on 17 September 1938 with first  crossborder operations.

Brandenburg Division 

Based on the successful utilization of the ' tactics against Czechoslovakia and in psychological warfare against Czechoslovak allies, the  later in September 1939 established the so-called "1st Construction Training Company for special purposes" that had former Freikorps members as their core. This later rose to the size of division. The division was known for large scale use of tactics that involved its soldiers wearing enemy uniforms, conducting saboteur actions behind enemy lines and many war crimes.

References

Sudetenland
Organizations based in Czechoslovakia
1938 establishments in Czechoslovakia
1939 disestablishments in Czechoslovakia
Military units and formations established in 1938
Military units and formations disestablished in 1939
Nazi Party organizations
Czechoslovakia–Germany relations